Learn from the Pros is a television program sponsored by the online poker website Full Tilt Poker, which aired on Fox Sports Net a number of times during each week. It was hosted by Chris Rose.

Each episode opened with Rose discussing an element of poker strategy with a professional poker player associated with the Full Tilt site, usually Howard Lederer. The discussion was illustrated with footage from one or more hands from Poker Superstars or another FSN-televised poker tournament. The point was further illustrated by the play of a mock hand by actors, once showing the play without following the tip and once following it. Tips ranged from such basic points of strategy as starting hand selection to more advanced plays like semi-bluffing and slowplaying.

In another segment, Rose hosted a roundtable discussion among several pros like Annie Duke, Phil Hellmuth, Mike Matusow, Daniel Negreanu and others. Initially the pros expanded on the tip of the episode, relating personal experiences with the play and sometimes illustrated by another videotaped hand in which one or more of the pros was involved. The final segment returned to the pros and may have touched again on the tip of the episode or ranged to another unrelated topic.

Other segments featured in various episodes included Chris Ferguson precision-throwing playing cards and slicing various fruits and vegetables with thrown cards, lessons on spotting tells, Antonio Esfandiari teaching chip tricks and pros answering viewer questions sent by email.

Segments from the broadcast are available for download at the iTunes Store.

Full Tilt Poker
Television shows about poker
Poker in North America